Journal of a Novel: The East of Eden Letters is a series of letters written by John Steinbeck to his friend and editor Pascal Covici,  in parallel with the first draft of his longest novel, East of Eden. The letters were written between January, 29- October 31, 1951.  They were not meant for publication, but an edited version was first published by Viking the year after the author's death in 1968. Steinbeck's letters were mostly written on the left hand pages of a notebook where the right hand pages had the text of East of Eden (novel). 
1969 non-fiction books
Books by John Steinbeck
History of Monterey County, California
Diaries
Books published posthumously
Books about writing
Viking Press books